Malaika Uwamahoro (formerly Angel Uwamahoro, born 1990) is a Rwandan-born actress, poet, singer, and social justice activist. She resides in Portland, Maine, United States.

Early life and education
Uwamahoro was born in Rwanda in 1990. Due to events leading to the subsequent 1994 Genocide against the Tutsi, her mother fled with her to Uganda where she lived for seven years, then to the United States and finally in 2001, back to Rwanda. She obtained a Bachelor of Arts degree in Theatre Studies at Fordham University, New York City.

Career

Film
She featured in Tomas Petkovski's 2018 film, LoveLess Generation. In a television series created in the same year by Tola Olatunji titled, Yankee Hustle, also featuring Jide Kosoko, Uche Jombo, Kara Rainer and others, she plays the role of "Princess".

In 2019, she was featured in the film directed by the Franco-Afghan filmmaker Atiq Rahimi, Our Lady of the Nile (French: Notre-Dame du Nil). She also made her debut stage play, Miracle in Rwanda again featured in the off-Broadway play by Leslie Lewis Sword and Edward Vilga titled, Miracle in Rwanda. For this play, she was nominated in the Best Solo Performance category at the 2019 VIV Award.

Music
She was featured by Mucyo (a Rwandan singer) in a song titled Stickin' 2 You, produced by Eloi El.

Poetry and others
She performed at the International Day of Reflection on the Genocide in Rwanda in 2017. She was named as one of the performers at the 2019 DanceAfrica event. In 2020, during the lockdown, she was said to have written the poem, I Don't Mind!.

She was one of the speakers nominated to speak at the Forbes Woman Africa 2020 Leading Women Summit, held in Durban, South Africa.

Filmography

Films

Television

Accolades

References

External links
 Malaika Uwamahoro on IMDb

Rwandan actresses
Living people
1990 births
Rwandan women poets
Rwandan activists
Rwandan women singers
Actresses from Portland, Maine
Activists from Portland, Maine
Musicians from Portland, Maine
Rwandan emigrants to the United States
Fordham University alumni
21st-century American women